The 1955 Mississippi gubernatorial election took place on November 8, 1955, in order to elect the Governor of Mississippi. Incumbent Democrat Hugh L. White was term-limited, and could not run for reelection to a second term. As was common at the time, the Democratic candidate ran unopposed in the general election so therefore the Democratic primary was the real contest, and winning the primary was considered tantamount to election.

Democratic primary
No candidate received a majority in the Democratic primary, which featured 5 contenders, so a runoff was held between the top two candidates. The runoff election was won by Attorney General James P. Coleman, who defeated lawyer Paul B. Johnson Jr., son of former Governor Paul B. Johnson Sr.

Results

Runoff

General election
In the general election, Coleman ran unopposed.

Results

References

1955
gubernatorial
Mississippi
November 1955 events in the United States